FAAN may refer to:

 Faan value, in mahjong
 Fanweyn (Somali: Faan Weyn), a town in the Gedo region of Somalia
 Federal Airports Authority of Nigeria
 Food Allergy & Anaphylaxis Network
 Fellow of the American Academy of Neurology
 Fellow of the American Academy of Nursing